Pine Valley is a neighborhood in Houston, Texas, located at the crossing of I-45 and the 610 South Loop and ends at Long Drive. It is the 3rd Biggest Super-Neighborhood Of Southeast Houston. It is divided into two territories by a railroad located at Griggs St. 

Neighborhoods in Houston